Fossano railway station is the railway station serving the comune of Fossano, in the Piedmont region, northwestern Italy. It is the junction of the Turin–Savona and Fossano–Cuneo railways.

The station is currently managed by Rete Ferroviaria Italiana (RFI). Train services are operated by Trenitalia.  Each of these companies is a subsidiary of Ferrovie dello Stato (FS), Italy's state-owned rail company.

History
The station was opened on 15 December 1853, upon the inauguration of the track from Savigliano to Fossano of the Turin–Savona railway.

Features
Seven tracks of which are equipped with platforms, pass through the station.

Train services
The station is served by the following services:

Express services (Regionale veloce) Turin - Fossano - San Giuseppe di Cairo – Savona
Express services (Regionale veloce) Fossano - Cuneo
Regional services (Treno regionale) Fossano - San Giuseppe di Cairo
Regional services (Treno regionale) Fossano - Limone
Turin Metropolitan services (SFM7) Fossano - Turin

See also

 History of rail transport in Italy
 List of railway stations in Piedmont
 Rail transport in Italy
 Railway stations in Italy

References

External links

Railway stations in Piedmont
Railway stations opened in 1853

Railway stations in Italy opened in 1853